Krasnodon Raion was a raion (district) in Luhansk Oblast of eastern Ukraine. The raion was abolished on 18 July 2020 as part of the administrative reform of Ukraine, which reduced the number of raions of Luhansk Oblast to eight. However, since 2014 the raion was not under control of Ukrainian government and has been part of the Luhansk People's Republic which continues using it as an administrative unit. The administrative center of the raion is the city of Krasnodon, which previously was incorporated as a city of oblast significance and did not belong to the raion, but in 2015 was merged into the raion.

Since 2014, the raion has been controlled by forces of the Luhansk People's Republic. In 2016, the Verkhovna Rada renamed it Sorokyne Raion, implementing the law prohibiting names of Communist origin. The name is not recognized locally.

Demographics
As of the Ukrainian Census of 2001:

Ethnicity
Russian: 51.7%
Ukrainian: 45.9%
Belarusians: 0.9%

 Language
Russian  68.8%
Ukrainian  30.0%
Armenian  0.1%
Belarusian  0.1%

References

Former raions of Luhansk Oblast
1938 establishments in Ukraine
Ukrainian raions abolished during the 2020 administrative reform